EA202 series, colloquially known as KfW i9000 after its financial backer the KfW, is an electric multiple unit train type produced by Industri Kereta Api (INKA) which operates across the KAI Commuter Yogyakarta Line and formerly in Greater Jakarta. EA202 series was purchased by Ministry of Transportation for 40 units (10 sets). KA Magazine June 2014 Edition 

INKA collaborated with Bombardier Transportation to build EA202 series and it was completed in 2011. A total of 40 units (10 series) of 4 cars began to be brought in from the INKA factory in Madiun to Jakarta and went through a series of trials to see the performance and reliability.

In early 2013, EA202 series, which is similar in shape to EA201 series, underwent a trial operation before it is currently operating.

Formation

History 
EA202 basically has a formation of 4 cars in one series. Because there are only 4 cars in one series, the 2 circuits (TS) are finally combined into one so that they become 8 cars in one series. The first series to operate were the combined TS1 + TS2 and TS9 + TS10 on 19 February 2013, followed by TS3 + TS4 and TS5 + TS6 on 7 March 2013, and TS7 + TS8 on 27 March 2013.

EA202 series was also operated in a single circuit (1 TS), for Feeder before it was operated in combination with 2 TS to fulfill the formation of 8 trains in 1 series. At the beginning of the operation trial, EA202 series only served in –, Tanah Abang–Maja, as well as feeder cross Kampung Bandan–Jakarta Kota and Manggarai–Tanah Abang–Kampung Bandan–Jakarta Kota. However, EA202 series eventually operates on other routes in Greater Jakarta.

Even though EA202 series is the EMU with the coldest AC, EA202 series was withdrawn to INKA due to several reliability problems such as breaking down, but eventually returned to operation, even though it was only a Feeder (eject) and rarely served in crowded traffic. In addition, due to lack of maintenance, many of these EMUs have hot air conditioners.

Several EA202 series sets not brought to INKA were also stored at the Depok depot, but in the end the EA202 series was pulled to INKA Madiun to undergo refurbishment.

EA202 series sets have undergone refurbishment at INKA, both on the electrical system and on the exterior and interior, and now EA202 series uses a red and white batik livery and chairs which are now brown. Right now EA202 series are currently used for the KRL Commuterline on the Solo–Yogyakarta route. EA202 series started service on the route on early 2021.

References 

Electric multiple units of Indonesia

1500 V DC multiple units
Bombardier Transportation multiple units